Aethalida dora is a moth of the family Erebidae described by Georg Semper in 1899. It is found on Mindanao in the Philippines.

Adults have been recorded on wing from April to May and from July to December.

References

Moths described in 1910
Spilosomina
Moths of Asia